Ahmed Kousay Al-Taie (22 July 1965 – 2008) was a United States Army soldier who was kidnapped in October 2006 in Baghdad and later killed by his captors; as of November 2021, he was the latest missing U.S. serviceman from the Iraq War to be recovered.

Early life and education
Al-Taie was born in Iraq on 22 July 1965, to Kousay and Nawal Altaie. At the age of nine, he emigrated with his family from Iraq to the United Kingdom. He was of mixed Sunni and Shia parentage.

Career
Al-Taie enlisted in the United States Army Reserve in December 2004. He was mobilized in August 2005 and deployed to Iraq in November 2005. During his tenure in the United States Army, Altaie served as a linguist.

Prisoner of war
On 23 October 2006, Al-Taie left his military base in Iraq without authorization or the knowledge of his superiors. It is believed that he was in the Karrada neighborhood in central Baghdad, Iraq to visit the family of his second wife, Israa Abdul-Satar, a student at al-Mustansiriya University. He was captured by armed men and forced into a waiting vehicle outside.

On 2 November 2006, a ransom demand for Altaie was relayed to his uncle Entifadh Qanbar, a former spokesman for the Iraqi National Congress and recently an official in the Iraqi Ministry of Defense. Qanbar made contact with an intermediary trusted by the kidnappers. In a secret location in Baghdad, the mediator met with members of the group who showed Qanbar a grainy video on a cell phone screen of a man they claimed was Altaie, beaten up and bloody, and demanded $250,000 from the soldier's family to secure his release.

Qanbar stated that he would not talk about a price until he had seen for himself some proof that Altaie was still breathing. Qanbar suggested they have his nephew describe the inside of his home in Ann Arbor or that the kidnappers photograph the soldier holding a current newspaper by 4 November 2006 at 12:00pm.

The U.S. government said on 11 November 2006 that it was offering a US$50,000 reward for information leading to the recovery of Altaie's body.

On 14 February 2007, a proof of life video of Al-Taie was posted on a militant Shiite website. A previously unknown group called the "Ahel al-Beit Brigades" claimed responsibility for Altaie's abduction. The eight second video showed Altaie reading from a paper but no audio was heard. He appeared thin but in good health. His uncle identified him as the man in the video.

Al-Taie was the last U.S. serviceman to be accounted for in Iraq. He was captured when he was the rank of specialist and was promoted to sergeant, then staff sergeant.

On 26 February 2012, U.S. military officers informed Ahmed Al-Taie's family in Ann Arbor, Michigan that he was confirmed dead. The remains of Al-Taie were turned over as part of an amnesty exchange agreement between the Iraqi government and the militant group Asa'ib Ahl al-Haq. Al-Taie's family believes he was killed at the end of 2008.

Personal life
Al-Taie's first wife was Linda Racey of Farmington Hills, Michigan.

See also 

  Wassef Ali Hassoun – A U.S. Marine who claimed to be captured by Iraqi insurgents; later discovered to be a hoax
 American POWs in the 2003 invasion of Iraq
 2004 Iraq KBR convoy ambush – Capture and execution of Keith Matthew Maupin, a U.S. Army soldier
 June 2006 abduction of U.S. soldiers in Iraq – Capture and execution of Kristian Menchaca and Thomas L. Tucker, two U.S. Army soldiers
 Karbala provincial headquarters raid – Capture and execution of Brian Freeman, Jacob Fritz, Jonathan Chism and Shawn Falter, four U.S. Army soldiers
 May 2007 abduction of U.S. soldiers in Iraq – Capture and execution of Alex Ramon Jimenez, Joseph John Anzack and Byron Wayne Fouty, three U.S. Army soldiers
 List of kidnappings
 List of solved missing person cases: post-2000

References

External links 

Search goes on for missing Americans in Iraq
A Ransom Demand for the Missing U.S. Soldier
Parents call missing U.S. soldier 'man of peace'
Report: Abducted GI had married Iraqi woman
Report: Missing soldier married Iraqi
Iraqi prime minister gives U.S. envoy an earful in private talks
US names kidnapped soldier

1965 births
2000s missing person cases
2008 deaths
American Muslims
American prisoners of war
Foreign hostages in Iraq
Iraqi emigrants to the United Kingdom
Iraqi emigrants to the United States
Iraq War prisoners of war
Kidnapped American people
Linguists
Missing person cases in Iraq
People from Ann Arbor, Michigan
United States Army personnel of the Iraq War
United States Army reservists
United States Army non-commissioned officers
American military personnel killed in the Iraq War